Walter Müller (1911–1969) was an Austrian film actor.

Selected filmography
 The Singing House (1948)
 The Black Forest Girl (1950)
 The Dubarry (1951)
 The Csardas Princess (1951)
 Season in Salzburg (1952)
 The Land of Smiles (1952)
 The White Horse Inn (1952)
 Mask in Blue (1953)
 Southern Nights (1953)
 To Be Without Worries (1953)
 Mask in Blue (1953)
 Hooray, It's a Boy! (1953)
 When The Village Music Plays on Sunday Nights (1953)
 Ball of Nations (1954)
 The Three from the Filling Station (1955)
 Three Days Confined to Barracks (1955)
 The False Adam (1955)
 Love, Girls and Soldiers (1958)
 Our Crazy Aunts (1961)

References

External links
 

1911 births
1969 deaths
Austrian male film actors
Male actors from Prague
Ingeborg Bachmann Prize winners
20th-century Austrian male actors